The Battle of Gagron was fought in 1519 between Mahmud Khalji II of Malwa and Rajput Confederacy of Rana Sanga. The conflict took place in Gagron (in the present-day Indian state of Rajasthan) and resulted in Sanga's victory, with him taking Mahmud captive and annexing significant territory.

Background
Following the death of the Sultan of Malwa, Nasir-ud-Din Khalji, a succession struggle erupted amongst his sons. Mahmud Khalji II emerged victorious, primarily with the aid of the Rajput chief Medini Rai. The latter amassed considerable influence, resulting in the enmity of the Muslim nobles, with even the new sultan finding it necessary to appeal to Muzaffar Shah II of Gujarat. A Gujarati army was dispatched to Mandu, held by Medini Rai's son, and besieged it. The Rajput chief in turn appealed to Rana Sanga of Mewar for aid, who then marched his army into Malwa, reaching Sarangpur. However, Mandu was captured by the Gujaratis, prompting Sanga to return to Mewar alongside Medini Rai, who was then employed in his service.

Battle
In retribution for them entering his territory, Mahmud marshalled an army against the Mewaris and marched it through Gagron. Sanga advanced with a large army from Chittor reinforced by the Rathors of Merta under Rao Viramdeva, and met Mahmud, accompanied by the Gujarat auxiliaries under Asaf Khan. The Mewari cavalry made a charge through that of the Gujarati, with the surviving men scattering. They subsequently did the same to the Malwa army, resulting in a decisive victory. Mahmud was wounded and taken prisoner by Rana Sanga, with most of his officers having died and his army decimated. Asaf Khan's son was killed, though he himself managed to escape.

Aftermath
Sanga subsequently took control of Gagron, as well as the regions of Bhilsa, Raisen, Sarangpur, Chanderi and Ranthambore. Mahmud was kept captive at Chittor for 6 months, though the Rana himself is said to have personally tended to his wounds. He was subsequently allowed an "honourable" return to his own lands, though one of his sons remained at Mewar as a hostage. Mahmud later sent Sanga a jewelled belt and crown as gifts. Sanga presented the Chittor fortress to Haridas Kesaria after their victory, who humbly declined and accepted a jagir of 12 villages in return.

References

History of Rajasthan
Gagron
Battles involving the Charanas